Pierluigi Di Già (born March 22, 1968 in Milan) is a retired Italian professional football player.

References

1968 births
Living people
Italian footballers
Serie A players
Serie B players
Inter Milan players
Parma Calcio 1913 players
Bologna F.C. 1909 players
Venezia F.C. players
Palermo F.C. players
Delfino Pescara 1936 players
Italian expatriate footballers
Expatriate soccer players in Australia
Italian expatriate sportspeople in Australia
Marconi Stallions FC players
A.C. Reggiana 1919 players

Association football midfielders